The Messenger Lectures are a series of talks given by scholars and public figures at Cornell University. They were founded in 1924 by a gift from Hiram Messenger of "a fund to provide a course of lectures on the Evolution of Civilization for the special purpose of raising the moral standard of our political, business, and social life", to be "delivered by the ablest non-resident lecturer or lecturers obtainable". The lecture series has been described as one of Cornell's most important of extracurricular activities.  

Initially a series of twelve lectures per year, there are now either three or six lectures by one speaker each semester.

Archeologist James Henry Breasted delivered the first series of Messenger Lectures in 1925.

Hiram Messenger 
Dr. Hiram John Messenger Jr (July 6, 1855 - Dec. 15, 1913; B. Litt., Phd,) was from Hartford, Connecticut and graduated from Cornell in 1880. He was a teacher of mathematics Associate Professor of Mathematics at the  University of the City of New York and an actuary of the Traveler's Insurance Company. The gift he left to Cornell was part of $4,000 mentioned in his will and a portion of his estate goes to Cornell each year. He was himself the youngest son of Hiram J. Messenger, a mercantile businessman and owner of banks.

The lectures
See the list of Messenger Lectures at Cornell University for a complete list

There have been over 80 talks given since 1924, the most famous of which is probably Richard Feynman's 7 lecture series in 1964, The Character of Physical Law, the videos of which were bought and made available to the public by Bill Gates in 2009.

A partial listing of some of the lecturers over the years is provided in Cornell's Messenger Lectures brochure as: 
Michael Moss (2016)
Cecilia Vicuña (2015)
Leonard Susskind (2014)
Nima Arkani-Hamed (2010)
Steven Weinberg (2007)
Sir Martin Rees (2005)
Maynard Solomon (1992)
Susan Moller Okin (1989)
Peter Nye (1989)
Edward W. Said (1986)
Quentin Skinner (1983)
Noam Chomsky (1976)
Edward O. Wilson (1976)
Richard Feynman (1964)
 1960-1961 Fred Hoyle, Astronomy, University of Cambridge
 1959-1960 Linus Pauling, Chemistry, California Institute of Technology
 1959-1960 Arthur F. Burns, Economics, Columbia University
 1958-1959 Vincent Wigglesworth, Zoology, University of Cambridge
 1957-1958 Guido Pontecorvo, Genetics, University of Glasgow
 1957-1958 Paul Tillich, Religion, Harvard University
 1956-1957 W. K. C. Guthrie, Classics, University of Cambridge
 1956-1957 Alfred L. Kroeber, Anthropology, University of California
 1955-1956 Edward C. Kirkland, History, Bowdoin College
 1955-1956 Arthur J. Altmeyer, Louis I. Dublin, Edward J. Stieglitz, Gerontology
 1954-1955 Philip Kuenen, Submarine Geology, Groningen, the Netherlands
 1954-1955 Alpheus T. Mason, Government, Princeton University
 1953-1954 Luther Gulick, Public Administration, New York
 1953-1954 C. B. van Niel, Bacteriology, Stanford University
 1952-1953 Joseph Wood Krutch, Drama, Columbia University
 1952-1953 Theodore von Karman, Engineering, California Institute of Technology
 1951-1952 Otto Struve, Astronomy, Yerkes Observatory
 1951-1952 Robert Redfield, Anthropology, University of Chicago
 1950-1951 William F. Albright, Archaeology, Johns Hopkins University
 1950-1951 Thomas A. Bailey, Russian-American Relations, Stanford University
 1950-1951 Jens Clausen, Botany, Stanford University
 1949-1950 Otto E. Neugebauer, History of Mathematics, Brown University
 1949-1950 Vincent du Vigneaud, Biochemistry, Cornell Medical College
 1948-1949 Otto Kinkeldey, Musicology, Harvard University
 1948-1949 Harvey Fletcher, Acoustics, Bell Telephone Laboratories
 1947-1948 Howard Mumford Jones, American Literature, Harvard University
 1947-1948 Catherine Bauer, Housing, University of Cambridge
 1947-1948 Marjorie Hope Nicolson, English Literature, Columbia University
 1946-1947 Sumner Slichter, Economics, Harvard University
 1945-1946 Hu Shih, History of Chinese Philosophy, Peking
 1945-1946 J. Robert Oppenheimer, Atomic Physics, California Inst. Of Technology
 1945-1946 C. C. Little, L. H. Snyder, H. J. Muller, Gene
 1944-1945 Douglas Bush, English Literature, Harvard University
 1944-1945 T. R. McConnell, W. H. Cowley, W. DeVane, Higher Education
 1944-1945 Charles E. Kellogg, Agronomy, U.S. Department of Agriculture
 1944-1945 Lydia Roberts, Nutrition, University of Chicago
 1943-1944 Griffith Taylor, Geography, Toronto
 1942-1943 Carl L. Becker, Cornell History, Cornell University
 1942-1943 H. Peyre, French Literature, Yale University
 1941-1942 H. M. Evans, Endocrinology, University of California
 1941-1942 T. M. River and others, Virus Diseases, Rockefeller Institute
 1940-1941 F. A. Pottle, Modern Poetry, Yale University
 1940-1941 H. E. Sigerist, History of Medicine, Johns Hopkins University
 1939-1940 T. D. Kendrick, Archaeology, British Museum
 1938-1939 G. P. Adams, Philosophy, University of California
 1938-1939 G. H. McIlwain, History of Political Theory, Harvard University
 1937-1938 E. J. Dent, Musicology, University of Cambridge
 1936-1937 Isaiah Bowman, Geography, Johns Hopkins University
 1936-1937 Robert Hegner, Parasitology, Johns Hopkins University
 1935-1936 W. M. Calder, History of Christianity, University of Edinburgh
 1934-1935 W. C. Mitchell, Economics, Columbia University
 1933-1934 Sir Arthur Eddington, Astronomy, University of Cambridge
 1932-1933 B. Malinowski, Anthropology, London
 1931-1932 F. J. Mather, Fine Arts, Princeton University
 1930-1931 T. H. Morgan, Genetics, California Institute of Technology
 1929-1930 Roscoe Pound, Law, Harvard University
 1928-1929 E. L. Thorndike, Psychology, Columbia University
 1927-1928 T. F. Tout, English History, Manchester
 1926-1927 H. J. C. Grierson, English Literature, University of Edinburgh
 1925-1926 R. A. Milliken, Physics, California Institute of Technology
 1924-1925 J. H. Breasted, Ancient History, Chicago

See also 
 Project Tuva

References

External links
 Feynman's Messenger Lectures

Cornell University
Lecture series